Warsaw is a city located in Benton County, Missouri, United States. The population was 2,127 at the 2010 census. Warsaw is the county seat of Benton County.

Adjacent to the Osage River it is heavily tied to two major lakes on the river.  The uppermost reaches of Lake of the Ozarks is part of southwest city limits and the Truman Dam and Truman Reservoir are on its northwest side.

History
The original inhabitants of the area were the Delaware, Shawnee, Sac, Kickapoo, and Osage tribes (namesake of the Osage River which passed by the city). French settlers visited the area as early as 1719.

Warsaw was platted in 1837. The city was incorporated in 1843 and designated as the county seat of Benton County. The city was named after Warsaw, the capital city of Poland, in honor of the Revolutionary War hero Tadeusz Kościuszko, who was Polish and had also fought for independence in his homeland.  Warsaw was a steamboat port, the furthest point up the Osage River they could navigate.

Permanent immigrants to the area were Germans, Scotch-Irish, and English, as well as transplant farmers from Kentucky, Tennessee and the Carolinas, first arriving circa 1820.

In 1931 the upper reaches of Lake of the Ozarks reached the community on the Osage River.  The dam for Truman Reservoir on the Osage River just northwest of the city limits officially opened 1979 after construction began in 1964.  Place names for many lake related businesses including the Harry S. Truman Regional Visitor Center have the Warsaw mailing address even though they are outside the city limits.  The Warsaw city limits do not include Truman Reservoir lakefront.  City limits do include waterfront the upper reaches of the Osage Arm of the Lake of the Ozarks.

The Upper Bridge was listed on the National Register of Historic Places in 1999.  The bridge is the first crossing of the Osage River below the Truman Dam is actually a crossing of Lake of the Ozarks.

Geography
Warsaw is located at 38°14'43" North, 93°22'38" West (38.245195, -93.377227). The total area is 7.6% water given its southern border the upper reaches of Lake of the Ozarks. Warsaw is located on a junction of U.S. Route 65 and Missouri Route 7. It is located on the northern terminus of Missouri Route 83.

Climate
This remains the hottest temperature ever recorded in the state of Missouri. The average annual temperature is 56.7°F.

Demographics

2010 census
As of the census of 2010, there were 2,127 people, 914 households, and 523 families living in the city. The racial makeup of the city was 96.3% White, 1.0% African American, 1.1% Native American, 0.2% Asian, 0.4% from other races, and 0.9% from two or more races. Hispanic or Latino of any race were 3.2% of the population.

There were 914 households, of which 27.4% had children under the age of 18 living with them, 41.6% were married couples living together, 12.1% had a female householder with no husband present, 3.5% had a male householder with no wife present, and 42.8% were non-families. 37.7% of all households were made up of individuals, and 21% had someone living alone who was 65 years of age or older. The average household size was 2.20 and the average family size was 2.88.

The median age in the city was 45 years. 22.7% of residents were under the age of 18; 6% were between the ages of 18 and 24; 21.2% were from 25 to 44; 25.1% were from 45 to 64; and 25% were 65 years of age or older. The gender makeup of the city was 46.7% male and 53.3% female.

2000 census
As of the census of 2000, there were 2,070 people, 923 households, and 539 families living in the city. The population density was 1,045.5 people per square mile (403.7/km). There were 1,027 housing units at an average density of 518.7 per square mile (200.3/km). The racial makeup of the city was 98.36% White, 0.14% African American, 0.43% Native American, 0.05% Asian, 0.05% Pacific Islander, 0.10% from other races, and 0.87% from two or more races. 1.26% of the population were Hispanic or Latino of any race.

There were 923 households, out of which 24.2% had children under the age of 18 living with them, 44.7% were married couples living together, 10.7% had a female householder with no husband present, and 41.6% were non-families. 38.6% of all households were made up of individuals, and 21.5% had someone living alone who was 65 years of age or older. The average household size was 2.12, and the average family size was 2.78.

In the city, the population was spread out, with 21.7% under the age of 18, 7.1% from 18 to 24, 22.9% from 25 to 44, 21.2% from 45 to 64, and 27.1% who were 65 years of age or older. The median age was 44 years. For every 100 females, there were 79.7 males. For every 100 females age 18 and over, there were 77.7 males.

The median income for a household in the city was $23,583, and the median income for a family was $33,068. Males had a median income of $24,464 versus $19,301 for females. The per capita income for the city was $15,262. 18.5% of the population and 9.5% of families were below the poverty line. 24.7% of those under the age of 18 and 14.2% of those 65 and older were living below the poverty line.

Education
Warsaw R-IX School District operates four schools at Warsaw: North Elementary School, South Elementary School, John Boise Middle School, and Warsaw High School.

Warsaw has a public library, a branch of the Boonslick Regional Library.

References

External links
 Historic maps of Warsaw in the Sanborn Maps of Missouri Collection at the University of Missouri

Cities in Benton County, Missouri
County seats in Missouri
Cities in Missouri